Cartoon Lizard is a Canadian indie pop band from Victoria, British Columbia.  They have released 3 mid-length EPs.  The band consists of Trevor Lang, Ritchie Hemphill, Alex Maunders, Shilo Preshyon and Brennan Doyle.


History

Founding members Trevor Lang  and Ritchie Hemphill formed a band in high school under the name "Animal Astronauts", which eventually disbanded and was replaced by the solo project of Trevor Lang. While Hemphill and Shilo Preshyon’s musical co-operations blossomed while living together in the city of Vancouver, and Preshyon and Alex Maunders found similarities in their musical style while attending Vancouver Community College, Brennan Doyle joined Lang’s solo act, re-emerging as the duo Tango Lima. After all five found themselves residing in Victoria, British Columbia, with no time-consuming musical obligations, Any previous projects were dropped to move forward with Cartoon Lizard, as all members had only dreamed of doing years prior. After the release of singles such as "Top of the Mornin'" and "Not Punk Not Raw", Cartoon Lizard found attention from various Canadian News outlets for their original and feel-good harmonies and  idiosyncratic instrumentation.

Not Punk Not Raw
In April 2017, Cartoon Lizard released their debut self-produced EP Not Punk Not Raw. The EP was sold as a limited-run cassette tape as well as in digital download form. The EP received favorable praises from various Canadian media outlets such as Exclaim, Pop Matters, Ride the Tempo, and Indie88.

Sentinels
In January of 2020, Cartoon Lizard released a series of singles dropped throughout the previous two years collectively, with the addition of the title track, as their second EP, Sentinels. The EP was previously available for online streaming, though additionally was given a limited cassette tape run.

Bless You, Thank You
Cartoon Lizard released their latest and most ambitious project to date, "Bless You, Thank You", on April 15, 2020 to all streaming platforms. The ten track EP is the culmination of several singles and music videos put out throughout the year. During the making of "Bless You, Thank You", Brennan and Trevor were doubling in the studio working on the Haley Blais record produced by Tennis, while Shilo was tenuring with John Goodmanson on Wolf Parade’s 2020 record, Thin Mind. The project is available for online streaming, digital download, and is set to have a cassette tape run.

Musical style
Their music has been described as "A cool mixture of '60s influenced psychedelic sunshine pop" and "Honest, quixotic, and feel-good", with their songs demonstrating "sun-drenched harmonies and groovy, retro-sounding instrumentation", and "simultaneously nuanced and extravagant tunes". The quintet cites acts such as Animal Collective, Beach Boys, Beatles, Sufjan Stevens, Wilco, The Flaming Lips, Joanna Newsom, Frank Ocean, GBV, MBV, Talking Heads, D’Angelo, & Mouse On Mars as influences.

Discography

Extended plays

Singles
"Yes Ma'am, It's Me" (December 2017)
"My House" (October 2018)
"For 1 2" (December 2018)
"Lay of the Land" (February 2019)
"Neighboring Hotels"  (March 2019)

Members

Current members 
Trevor Lang (2015−present)
Ritchie Hemphill (2015−present)
Alex Maunders (2015−present)
Shilo Preshyon (2015−present)
Brennan Doyle (2015−present)

References

External links

Canadian indie pop groups
Musical groups from Victoria, British Columbia
2015 establishments in British Columbia